Julio Enrique Gotay Sánchez (April 9, 1939 – July 4, 2008) was a Puerto Rican professional baseball player, a shortstop and second baseman who played all or parts of ten seasons (1960–69) for the St. Louis Cardinals, Pittsburgh Pirates, Los Angeles Angels and Houston Astros of Major League Baseball. He was the uncle of infielder Rubén Gotay.

Career
He made his major league debut at age 21 on August 6, 1960, as the host Cardinals defeated the Cincinnati Reds 6–5. In his first career at-bat, pinch-hitting for pitcher Ed Bauta in the sixth inning, he singled off Cincinnati southpaw Joe Nuxhall for his first big-league hit.

He started 105 games at shortstop and batted .255 with two home runs, 12 doubles and 27 runs batted in in 406 plate appearances. But on November 19, he was sent to the Pirates in a four-player trade that brought veteran shortstop and 1960 National League Most Valuable Player Dick Groat to St. Louis.

He retired from baseball after the 1971 minor-league season, which he spent at Triple-A in the Cardinals' organization. In 389 games played in the major leagues, Gotay collected 257 hits, with 38 doubles, three triples, six home runs and 70 RBI.

After retiring from baseball, he spent many years as a physical education teacher in Ponce, Puerto Rico.

Gotay died from prostate cancer on July 4, 2008, at age 69 in Ponce. He was buried at the Old Fajardo Municipal Cemetery. He was married to his wife, Silvia Irizarry, for 48 years. He had four children, Julio Gotay, Agustín Gotay, Irma Gotay, and Silvia Gotay.

References

External links

1939 births
2008 deaths
Charleston Marlins players
Columbus Jets players
Daytona Beach Islanders players
Deaths from cancer in Puerto Rico
Deaths from prostate cancer
Houston Astros players
Los Angeles Angels players
Major League Baseball players from Puerto Rico
Major League Baseball shortstops
Oklahoma City 89ers players
People from Fajardo, Puerto Rico
Pittsburgh Pirates players
Puerto Rican expatriate baseball players in Canada
Rochester Red Wings players
St. Louis Cardinals players
San Juan Marlins players
Seattle Angels players
Tulsa Oilers (baseball) players
Winnipeg Goldeyes players
Wytheville Cardinals players